Ambanad Hills or Ambanad is a hill station in Punalur Taluk in the eastern part of Kollam district in Kerala, India. This is one among the few tea and orange plantation areas in Kollam district. Ambanad Hills is in Aryankavu panchayath, about 12 km away from Kazhuthurutty.

The place is a famous tourist destination in South Kerala and is popularly known as 'Mini Munnar'. The tea estate in Ambanad hills is set up by the British people it is the only tea estate in Kollam district. The plantation and estate is controlled and managed by Travancore Rubber and Tea Company. The estate falls in Clove belt of India (Kollam - Nagercoil) and is one of the largest Clove estate in the country. It was one of the first places in country to which East India Company introduced clove in 1800s. The crop harvesting requires skilled labour and hence every year, the migrant labourers from Tamil Nadu will stay at the estate and work for nearly a month for harvesting the clove.

Attractions 

 Estate Bungalow with night stay
 Kudamutti waterfall
 View points
 Tea Factory with British era equipments
 Three lakes with pedal boating
 Nedumpara Peak

See also

 Kollam
 Thenmala
 Thenmala Dam
 Kazhuthurutty railway station
 Aryankavu

References

Hill stations in Kerala
Tourist attractions in Kollam district